Joseph Gilpin (1 August 1725–30 March 1790) was an American politician.

He was born to Samuel Gilpin and Jane Parker in Chester County, Pennsylvania. Gilpin and his family relocated to Cecil County, Maryland in his childhood. He inherited a large tract of land and began building a county seat for Cecil County. He married Sarah Elizabeth Reed. Together they had eleven children. Influential in his Maryland sphere, he became one of the first to call for independence. In 1770, he was elected as a member to the American Philosophical Society.

He served as a representative at the Provincial convention in Annapolis (1775), joined the convention to draft a constitution for the state of Delaware (1776), became a delegate to the Provincial convention (1777), the Maryland Assembly (1777), and began serving as presiding Justice of the first court of Cecil County, which he held until his death. He also attended the Maryland convention for the ratification of the United States Constitution (1787), and the Philadelphia conference regarding the restoration of public credit (1780). His brother, Thomas Gilpin (1727-1778), was also a prominent member of the American Philosophical Society.

He died in his home in Cecil County.

References

1725 births
1790 deaths
Members of the American Philosophical Society
Maryland in the American Revolution